Utigurs were Turkic nomadic equestrians who flourished in the Pontic–Caspian steppe in the 6th century AD. They possibly were closely related to the Kutrigurs and Bulgars.

Etymology
Lajos Ligeti proposed utur- (to resist), while Louis Bazin uturkar (the victors-conquerors), Quturgur and qudurmaq (the enrages).

There has been little scholarly support for theories linking the names Kutrigur and Utigur to peoples such as the Guti/Quti and/or Udi/Uti, of Ancient Southwest Asia and the Caucasus respectively, which have been posited by scholars such as Osman Karatay, and Yury Zuev. No evidence has been presented that the Guti moved from their homeland in the Zagros Mountains (modern Iran/Iraq) to the Steppes, and they are widely believed to have spoken an Indo-European (rather than Turkic) language. The Udi were mentioned by Pliny the Elder (Natural History, VI, book, 39), in connection with the Aorsi (sometimes jointly as the Utidorsi), the Sarmatians and a Scythian caste/tribe known as the Aroteres ("Cultivators"), who lived "above the maritime coast of [Caucasian] Albania and the ... Udini" on the western shores of the Caspian Sea. Neither is there general acceptance of Edwin G. Pulleyblank's suggestion that the Utigurs may be linked to the Yuezhi – an Indo-European people that settled in Western China during ancient times.

History
The origin of relative tribes Utigurs and Kutrigurs is obscure. Procopius wrote that "Beyond the Sagins dwell many Hunnish tribes. The land is called Evlisia and barbarians populate the sea-coast and the inland up to the so called lake of Meotida and the river Tanais. The people living there were called Cimmerians, and now they are called Utigurs. North of them are the populous tribes of the Antes." They occupied the Don-Azov steppe zone, the Kutrigurs in the Western part and the Utigurs towards the East.

Procopius also recorded a genealogical legend according to which:

This story was also confirmed by the words of the Utigur ruler Sandilch, "it is neither fair nor decent to exterminate our tribesmen (the Kutrigurs), who not only speak a language, identical to ours, who are our neighbours and have the same dressing and manners of life, but who are also our relatives, even though subjected to other lords".

Agathias (c. 579–582) wrote:

When the Kutrigurs invaded the lands of the Byzantium Empire, Emperor Justinian I (527–565) through diplomatic persuasion and bribery dragged the Kutrigurs and Utigurs into mutual warfare. Utigurs led by Sandilch attacked the Kutrigurs who suffered great losses. According to Procopius, Agathias and Menander, the Kutrigurs and Utigurs decimated one another, until they lost even their tribal names. Some Kutrigur remnants were swept away by the Avars to Pannonia, while the Utigurs remained in the Pontic steppe and fell under the rule of the Türks.

Their last mention was by Menander Protector, who recorded among  the Türk forces that attacked Bosporos in 576 an Utigur army led by chieftain Ανάγαιος (Anagai, Anağay). Bosphoros fell to them c. 579 AD. In the same year, Byzantine embassy to the Türks passed through the territory of Ἀκκάγας (Akagas, Aq-Qağan), "which is the name of the woman who rules the Scythians there, having been appointed at that time by Anagai, chief of the tribe of the Utigurs".

See also
 Kutrigurs
 Onogurs
 Bulgars

Notes

References

Sources
 
 
 
 

Turkic peoples of Europe
Migration Period